Mallalli Falls is situated in the northern region of Kodagu District, Karnataka. The Kumaradhara River is the main watercourse for this waterfall. The Kumaradhara later flows through Kukke Subrahmanya and merges with the Netravati River at Uppinangadi, which then empties into the Arabian Sea at Mangalore.

References

Waterfalls of Karnataka
Geography of Kodagu district